Beret is a village in Borsod-Abaúj-Zemplén County in northeastern Hungary.
 it had a population of 287.

References

Populated places in Borsod-Abaúj-Zemplén County